A Carrot Harvester  is an agricultural machine for harvesting carrots.  Carrot harvesters are either top lifters or share lifters and may be tractor mounted, trailed behind a tractor or self-propelled. The machine typically harvests between one and six rows of carrots at once.

Operation
The two types of harvesters differ in how they get the carrots from the ground.

Top lifting harvesters
Top lifters use rubber belts to grab the green tops of the carrot plant and pull them from the soil.  A share pushes under the carrot root and loosens the plant.

The belt takes the carrots, with tops, in to the machine where the tops are cut off and sent along a waste path and dropped back on to the field.

Share lifting harvesters
A share lifter uses a share to get the carrots out of the ground from underneath.  The machine must be preceded by a topper to cut the green tops off the carrot plants.  The carrots travel along a longer web to separate out the soil.

Cleaning and collection
The carrot roots travel along one or more webs to remove most of the soil attached to the carrot.  The carrots are collected either in a storage tank on the machine (called a "Bunker") or in a trailer pulled alongside the machine by another tractor.

References

External links

Agricultural machinery
Harvesters
Carrot